Richard Garrard (born 24 May 1937) was the seventh Suffragan Bishop of Penrith in the modern era.

Garrard was educated at Northampton Grammar School and King's College London. Ordained in 1962, he began his career with a curacy in Woolwich and was then successively a chaplain at Keswick Hall College of Education, principal of the  Church Army Training College, canon chancellor at Southwark Cathedral, educational advisor to the Diocese of St Edmundsbury and Ipswich and finally (before his elevation to the episcopate) Archdeacon of Sudbury.  From 2001 to 2003 he was the Archbishop of Canterbury's representative to the Holy See and director of the Anglican Centre in Rome. A renowned author, in retirement he continues to minister as an assistant bishop within the Diocese of Norwich.

References

1937 births
People educated at Northampton School for Boys
Alumni of King's College London
Associates of King's College London
Bishops of Penrith
20th-century Church of England bishops
21st-century Church of England bishops
Living people
Archdeacons of Sudbury